Russelia equisetiformis, the fountainbush, firecracker plant, coral plant, coral fountain, coralblow or fountain plant, is a species of flowering plant in the family Plantaginaceae.

This weeping subshrub is native to Mexico and Guatemala.

The Latin specific epithet means "like Equisetum" (the horse tail rush) - a plant which is only distantly related.

Description
The overall graceful form of the subshrub is a fountainesque mound. The stems and tiny oval leaves are bright green. It flowers profusely with small decumbent red flowers. It can bloom year round in tropical and subtropical climates.

It is a very popular nectar plant for hummingbirds and butterflies.

Cultivation
Russelia equisetiformis is cultivated as an ornamental plant, for temperate gardens and in window boxes, pots, and hanging planters. There are also cultivars with ivory white or pink flowers. Flowering is best with a minimum of half a day of sunlight, though the plant grows well in a range of situations.

The plant can be grown as an espalier on a trellis for vertical display, or a balcony—terrace screen (in a pot). However some authorities assert that it cannot tolerate temperatures below , and must therefore be kept under glass during the winter months. In colder climates it can overwinter as a houseplant in bright locations.

In cultivation in the UK, It has gained the Royal Horticultural Society’s Award of Garden Merit.

References

External links

Floridata: Russelia equisetiformis (Firecracker plant)
University of Florida; IFAS Extension: — Russelia equisetiformis
Flowers of India: Firecracker Plant (Russelia equisetiformis) images

Plantaginaceae
Flora of Mexico
Flora of Guatemala
Butterfly food plants
House plants
Garden plants of North America